David George MacDonald (July 23, 1936 – May 30, 1964) was an American road racing champion noted for his successes driving Corvettes and Shelby Cobras in the early 1960s. At the age of 27, he was killed in the 1964 Indianapolis 500, along with fellow driver Eddie Sachs. In his four-year racing career, MacDonald competed in 118 races with 52 victories and 75 top-three finishes.

MacDonald was inducted into the National Corvette Museum's Corvette Hall of Fame in 2014, and into the United States Road Racing Championship (USRRC) Hall of Fame in 2016.

Sports car and NASCAR racing career

MacDonald began racing in 1956, running a ’55 Chevrolet Corvette on Southern Californian drag strips. He won nearly 100 trophies between 1956 and 1959, all in Corvettes.

At the 1958 NHRA Western US Drag Racing Championships at Chandler Air Force Base in Arizona, MacDonald set two standing start speed records in a stock '58 Corvette – 104.68 mph in the ¼ mile and 123.11 mph in the 1/2 mile. Between 1958-1962 he drove Corvettes to six more speed records in the 1/4, 1/2 and one-mile distances at annual US speed trials.

MacDonald moved to the road racing circuit in 1960, and his first race was at Willow Springs Raceway on February 13–14. He ran a ’57 Corvette to a fourth place finish, behind winner Bob Bondurant in Saturday’s preliminary race, and then won Sunday’s feature race to record his first ever victory. At the end of the 1962 season, he had driven Corvettes to 28 victories in 64 races, including 42 top-three finishes. MacDonald’s unique style of drifting through turns at full speed made him a crowd favorite and earned him the nickname "Master of Oversteer".

In June 1962, Zora Arkus-Duntov selected Dave MacDonald and Dick Thompson to do the shakedown testing during development of Chevrolet's all new 1963 Corvette Sting Ray. Four days of all-out road testing were performed on a coupe and a convertible at the General Motors Proving Grounds in Milford, Michigan. General Motors used footage from these tests to create a promotional film entitled "Biography of a Sports Car". The film was distributed around the globe as part of GM's marketing campaign promoting the new sports car. In September Duntov and other Chevrolet executives presented MacDonald with the first ever 1963 Z06 Sting Ray that he race debuted at Riverside Raceway on October 13, 1962. The highly anticipated race also marked the debut of Carroll Shelby’s new Ford Cobra Roadster. MacDonald and Cobra driver Billy Krause exchanged the lead during the first hour before both cars dropped out with mechanical troubles.

At the start of the 1963 season, Carroll Shelby hired MacDonald away from Chevrolet to drive his Cobra Roadster. His first outing for Shelby American was February 2–3 at Riverside International Raceway and he drove Cobra CSX2026 to back-to-back victories. These were the Cobra’s first wins. Teammate Ken Miles finished second both days in Cobra CSX2002.

On February 17, 1963, MacDonald finished fourth in Cobra CSX2026 at the FIA Daytona Continental to give the Cobra its first top-five finish in international competition. Shelby retired the 260ci engines after this race and debuted the new Ford 289ci engine at the SCCA sanctioned races at Dodger Stadium on March 3–4, 1963. MacDonald again won both days in Cobra CSX2026 for the 289's first wins.

In the fall of 1963, MacDonald rose to national prominence after driving Shelby King Cobra CM/1/63 to back-to-back grand prix wins in the two biggest and richest road races in the world – the Los Angeles Times Grand Prix and the Monterey Pacific Grand Prix. These were the first wins for the Shelby King Cobra. In his next three races he finished second at the Hawaiian Grand Prix in Cobra Roadster CSX2136, second at NASCAR’s Golden State 400 in the Wood Brothers No. 21 Ford and second in NASCAR’s Augusta 510 behind Holman/Moody teammate and race winner Fireball Roberts.  For his efforts, MacDonald was awarded the Helms Athletic Foundation’s "Athlete of the Month" medallion for October 1963. The award was first issued in 1936 and given to the athlete who most dominated his or her sport through outstanding performance. MacDonald was only the ninth auto racer to receive this honor and the first during the US football season.

1964 would be MacDonald's final year in racing. He remained committed to a full Cobra schedule with Shelby American but also signed to run 20 races on the NASCAR circuit for Mercury team owner Bill Stroppe. MacDonald also signed a two-year contract with Mickey Thompson to run the 1964 and ’65 Indianapolis 500's.

On February 23, 1964, Dave MacDonald competed in his first and only Daytona 500, he finished 10th against a field NASCAR.com considers the greatest in NASCAR history Richard Petty won the '64 race, capturing his first of seven Daytona 500s.

March 1, 1964, MacDonald won the United States Road Racing Championships at Augusta International Raceway in Shelby King Cobra CM/1/63. His average speed of 97.653 MPH was 11 MPH faster than the previous track record set by Fireball Roberts in the Augusta 510. After this victory, hall of fame motor sports journalist, Chris Economaki, wrote that, "Dave MacDonald just stamped himself as one of today's road racing greats".

On March 21, 1964, MacDonald and co-driver Bob Holbert ran Shelby Cobra Daytona Coupe CSX2287 to the GT Class win (fourth overall) in the 12 Hours of Sebring international endurance race. This was the first win for the Shelby Cobra Daytona Coupes while also breaking Ferrari's 6-year win streak in the Grand Touring Division.

On April 19, 1964, MacDonald won the Phoenix FIA National Open at Phoenix International Raceway in Shelby King Cobra-Lang Cooper CM/1/64. This was the debut outing for CM/1/64 and its first win.

On May 3, 1964, MacDonald finished 2nd in the United States Road Racing Championships at Laguna Seca Raceway in Shelby King Cobra CM/1/64. He finished between the Chaparrals of race winner Jim Hall and 3rd-place finisher Roger Penske.

On May 10, 1964, MacDonald won the United States Road Racing Championships at Kent, Washington in King Cobra CM/3/63. The victory put him in a tie atop the USRRC Drivers' Championship standings with Jim Hall, who he invited to share the victory lap. This would be MacDonald's last race before his death three weeks later in the Indy 500.

Indy 500
Mickey Thompson hired MacDonald to drive one of his radical low profile rear-engine race cars in the 1964 Indy 500. Thompson's Ford-powered racers were specifically designed to run on 12" tires and made their debut in the 1963 Indy 500 under Chevrolet power. The cars became known as "roller skates". They were far ahead of their time, but badly designed and difficult to drive. Graham Hill tested the car before the '63 Indy race and refused to drive it because of its poor handling, a condition made worse for 1964 when Thompson was forced to completely redesign the cars to accommodate the new USAC-mandated  minimum tire height. 

One of the changes Thompson made to improve stability was to fit his cars with full-fendered aerodynamic body kits, unheard of at Indy's open-wheeled speedway. Thompson hired MacDonald, a rookie at Indy, and veteran racer Masten Gregory to drive two of his three cars in 1964, but several of the top drivers declined offers to drive the revolutionary but undeveloped cars. Graham Hill tested Thompson's new ‘64 design and, like the previous year decided against driving it in the race. Thompson selected Duane Carter to join Gregory and MacDonald, and in the first week of May, all three cars crashed or spun in practice. Gregory abruptly quit the team, citing the poor handling of his car, and Thompson found it difficult to find a replacement, as other available drivers took the advice of Gregory and stayed away. Fifteen-time Indy 500 competitor Eddie Johnson did accept Thompson’s offer and joined the team in mid-May. It was reported that while out practicing with MacDonald on Carb Day, 1963 World Champion Jim Clark noticed strange movements from MacDonald's car, followed him into the pits and urged him to "Get out of that car, mate - just walk away." According to journalist Chris Economaki, MacDonald never practiced with a full load of fuel due to Thompson's focus on high speeds. Despite handling woes, MacDonald qualified the Thompson No. 83 car at an average speed of 151.464 mph, placing him in the middle of row five and in 14th position. Johnson qualified Gregory's reconstructed No. 84 car, and placed it on the outside of row eight and in 24th position. On Bump Day, the final day of qualifying, Thompson hired Chuck Arnold (15th in the 1959 Indy 500) to put the 82 in the field and drive it in the race. While preparing for his qualifying attempt Arnold spun twice in separate practice runs and walked away from the ride. With just a few hours left in qualifying Thompson sought out Gregory and asked if he'd come back to the team and run the No. 82 car. Gregory, still without a ride for the 500, agreed to try and qualify the 82 but not run it in the race. Gregory's late day attempt fell short on speed and neither he nor the No. 82 ran the 500.

Death
MacDonald started in the 14th position in the 1964 Indy 500, and after dropping two positions on the first lap, he began passing cars and moving toward the leaders. As he passed Johnny Rutherford and Eddie Sachs, Rutherford noticed that MacDonald's car was very loose. Rutherford later said that, watching the behavior of MacDonald's car, he thought, "Whoa, he's either going to win this thing or crash." MacDonald was in the 10th position as he came out of turn four and on to the front straight to complete lap two. MacDonald moved left to pass Walt Hansgen and a split second later Hangsen moved left to pass Jim Hurtubise. MacDonald moved left again to avoid Hansgen and the front end of his car lifted and he lost control. His car slid across the track and hit the inside retaining wall, igniting the 45 gallon fuel load and causing a massive fire. His car then slid back up the track toward the outside wall and six more cars became involved.  Eddie Sachs, blinded by flames and smoke, broadsided MacDonald's car, resulting in another fireball. For the first time in its history, the Indianapolis 500 was stopped because of an accident. According to reports, Sachs died instantly due to blunt-force injuries, while MacDonald was transported to Methodist Hospital of Indianapolis and died two hours later. Eddie Johnson retired the other Thompson car after only six laps. The fiery crash led to safety changes at Indianapolis Motor Speedway, including a USAC requirement that cars carry less fuel, a change that led every team to switch from gasoline to methanol prior to the next year's Indy 500.

Carroll Shelby, Mickey Thompson, Bill Stroppe and Don Steves were among the pallbearers serving at MacDonald's funeral.

Notes
 MacDonald drove each of the legendary Shelby Cobras — Cobra Roadster, King Cobra and Cobra Daytona Coupe — to their first victories
 In 1964, MacDonald was set to make his motion picture debut in the Universal Pictures film, The Lively Set. The movie starred James Darren, Pamela Tiffin and Doug McClure, and was billed as a racing adventure. MacDonald played himself in the movie while also performing driving duties for Darren's character, “Casey Owens”. Universal was in the final stages of editing when MacDonald was killed in the Indianapolis 500. Citing sensitivity concerns, the studio delayed the release by two months and removed MacDonald's character from final editing, leaving a cameo appearance. Mickey Thompson, Duane Carter (MacDonald's Indy teammates) and Billy Krause also had cameos.
 In 2005, the Augusta International Raceway Preservation Society (AIRPS), in conjunction with city officials and homebuilders, named the main road looping through the new Diamond Lakes housing development as Dave MacDonald Drive. A portion of the community is built on old speedway land. Augusta International Raceway was constructed in 1963, but only three races were ever run there - two USRRC events and one NASCAR race. MacDonald competed in all three; finishing first in King Cobra CM/1/63 and second in a Cobra roadster in the USRRC races, and second in NASCAR's Augusta 510.
 In 2008, Carroll Shelby told Hot Rod magazine that, "Dave MacDonald had more raw talent probably than any race driver I ever saw." 
 At the 2010 "Legends of Riverside" event honoring Carroll Shelby, the Riverside International Automotive Museum posthumously honored MacDonald for his accomplishments at California's famed race track. Richie Ginther, Phil Hill and Chuck Daigh were also honored at the event.
 In 2013, The Henry Ford created a Dave MacDonald photo set that is now archived in their image collection
 In 2014, Dave MacDonald was inducted into the Corvette Hall of Fame
 In 2016, Dave MacDonald was inducted into the United States Road Racing Championship Hall of Fame.
 In 2016 Dave MacDonald's wife Sherry and son Rich, arranged to meet Eddie Sachs Jr's son Eddie and Swede Savage's daughter Angela at Indianapolis Motor Speedway during the 2016 Indianapolis 500. They memorialized this race day gathering with photos standing on the precise section of track where all three drivers lost their lives - Dave and Eddie Jr. in 1964 and Swede in 1973. 
 In 2017 Shelby American and Superformance released a Sebring Tribute Cobra finished in Dave MacDonald “Cotati livery”. The car is modeled after perhaps the most famous of all Shelby Cobras, CSX2128 - and liveried as it was when MacDonald ran it to its first victory at Cotati Raceway in May 1963.
 The MacDonald family actively participate in tributes to Dave, Carroll Shelby, and in other motorsport-related activity.

Sports car, NASCAR and Indy 500 results

Gallery

See also
 Dave MacDonald – Cobra Man (2018) Phil Henny book

References

External links

 Dave MacDonald Homepage

1936 births
1964 deaths
Racing drivers from California
Racing drivers from Los Angeles
Racing drivers who died while racing
Filmed deaths in motorsport
Indianapolis 500 drivers
NASCAR drivers
Sports deaths in Indiana
People from El Monte, California
Burials at Rose Hills Memorial Park